Scohaboy Bog (Móin na Scotha Buí in Irish) is a raised bog in County Tipperary in Ireland. It lies approximately 6 km northwest of Cloughjordan, County Tipperary, between the N52 and R490 roads. 

A Natural Heritage Area has been designated to protect the bog. The site is owned by Coillte, along with the adjacent Sopwell woods. Coillte refer to their section of the bog as being approximately 70 ha: the bog is described as "large" in the site synopsis for the Natural Heritage Area, but no area is given.
The bog was restored in a project running from 2011 to 2015.

Ecology
As well as typical high bog plants, Scohaboy provides habitat for the rare Sphagnum imbricatum, and Prunus padus has been recorded.
Scohaboy Bog supports a diversity of raised bog microhabitats, including extensive hummock/hollow complexes. Being one of the more southerly raised bogs in the country adds significantly to its ecological value.

Restoration
Scohaboy Bog is one of two demonstration sites for the European Union LIFE project,  "Demonstrating Best Practice in Raised Bog Restoration in Ireland"  (LIFE09 NAT/IE/000222). The project is being managed by Coillte and focuses on the restoration of 636 ha of raised bog habitat on 17 Coillte owned sites within the Natura 2000 Network and in Natural Heritage Areas. 
The project was jointly funded by EU Directorate-General for the Environment, the National Parks and Wildlife Service (at that time in the remit of the Department of Arts, Heritage and the Gaeltacht) and Coillte. 
The Cloughjordan Community Development Committee is involved in the management of the project at Scohaboy, where 71.80 ha of bog are being restored.

Coillte are aiming to improve the condition of the bog by implementing ecological restoration techniques developed in Restoring Raised Bog in Ireland, an earlier LIFE project in which Coillte was involved.
This involves removing non-native tree species and blocking drains. They are noting changes in vegetation and water levels.

Access
The demonstration site was officially opened in 2015 by Tom Hayes, TD.
A 400m wooden bog bridge leads to a raised platform where visitors can see views across the bog.

Protection
The bog was declared a Natural Heritage Area (ref. NHA 393) in 2005 under the Irish Wildlife Act. In 2015 it was reported that it was expected to be upgraded to Special Area of Conservation (SAC) status.

Threats
For centuries peat bogs have been harvested for turf (peat) for use as fuel for domestic fires. The tradition continues at Scohaboy.
There is evidence of drainage activity and fire damage.

References

Bogs of the Republic of Ireland
Natural Heritage Areas of the Republic of Ireland
Protected areas of County Tipperary
Protected areas established in 2005
Tourist attractions in County Tipperary
Cloughjordan